MLB 14: The Show is a baseball video game developed by San Diego Studio and published by Sony Computer Entertainment, based on Major League Baseball (MLB). It is the ninth entry of the MLB: The Show franchise. Announced on November 4, 2013, the game was released on April 1, 2014 for the PlayStation 3 and PlayStation Vita. The PlayStation 4 version was released on May 6, 2014. Detroit Tigers first baseman Miguel Cabrera is the featured athlete on the cover. As with the previous two entries, Canada has a unique cover, with Toronto Blue Jays third baseman Brett Lawrie on the cover.

Matt Vasgersian, Eric Karros, and Steve Lyons did the play-by-play action. Mike Carlucci returned as P.A. Announcer.

In March 2015, Sony announced the multiplayer support of the game would be shut down on June 18, 2015.

Reception 

Matt Beaudette of Hardcore Gamer gave the game a 4/5, calling it "excellent", going onto say that "it seems quite apparent most of the work on this year’s game went into getting it up and running on the PS4 with shiny new graphics."

Ryan McCaffrey of IGN gave the game an 8.1/10, saying it was "yet again, a stellar baseball simulation that's packed with enough quality game modes to occupy and entertain me for the entire season, but there are few exciting new features, and online is currently a very laggy experience."

Jack DeVries of GameSpot gave the game an 8/10, and commented "The presentation in The Show remains stellar, offering lively, informative commentary that holds more humor than you might expect."

The PlayStation 4 version of the game became the fastest-selling entry in the series to date within the first week of the game's release on the platform.

Soundtrack

References

External links

Official site

2014 video games
Major League Baseball video games
PlayStation 3 games
PlayStation 4 games
PlayStation Vita games
Video games set in Canada
Video games set in the United States
Sports video games with career mode
 14
Sony Interactive Entertainment games
Multiplayer and single-player video games
Video games developed in the United States
Video games set in Maryland
San Diego Studio games